In Washington, D.C., there are two current primary Interstate Highways and four current auxiliary Interstates. In addition, two proposed primary Interstates and two proposed auxiliary Interstates were cancelled in whole or in part.

Interstate 495, also known as the "Capital Beltway", creates an artificial boundary for the inner suburbs of Washington and is the root of the phrase "Inside the Beltway". Almost completely circling Washington, D.C., it crosses a tiny portion of the District at its southernmost point at the Woodrow Wilson Bridge. I-66 runs from the eastern edge of Georgetown, connects with the Beltway, and continues through Northern Virginia to I-81. I-295 comes up from the south starting at the eastern edge of the Woodrow Wilson Bridge on the Beltway and crosses the Anacostia River into downtown, linking up with I-395 (the Southwest Freeway), a major commuter route extending from New York Avenue to the Beltway and Interstate 95 in Springfield, Virginia, via I-695 (the Southeast Freeway).  The Inner Loop was a proposed network of freeways in the city center; however, only portions of it were ever built. Today, the "inner loop" is most frequently used to describe the inside lanes of 495. That is those that travel clockwise around Washington.


Interstate Highways

See also

References

 
Interstate